Besla cossmanni is a species of sea snail, a marine gastropod mollusk in the family Pyramidellidae, the pyrams and their allies. The species is one of twelve known species within the Besla genus of gastropods.

References

 Micali P., Nofroni I. & Perna E. (2012) Parthenina alesii n. sp. from Eastern Mediterranean, and notes on Parthenina dantarti (Peñas & Rolán in Peñas, Rolán & Ballesteros, 2008) (Gastropoda: Heterobranchia: Pyramidellidae). Bollettino Malacologico 48(1): 69-72. ["Finito di stampare" 30 May 2012]

External links

Pyramidellidae
Gastropods described in 1924